The Future of Oil: A Straight Story of the Canadian Oil Sands is a 2012 book by the Canadian engineer, writer, and oil sands manager Sanjay K. Patel that identifies and responds to a pressing concern of many: without increasing oil supply, the future is bleak and there is a risk of high oil prices. Patel works for Suncor Energy Inc.

Summary
The book starts with the argument that objective considerations of economic necessity, along with the nature of current technological limitations, should lead us to a series of connected and inescapable conclusions. According to the author, transition to an age of cleaner energy production is necessary and inevitable, but we cannot yet live without oil; oil must have a future, or we do not have one. He adds that since conventional oil reserves are dwindling, we really have no alternative: we need to increasingly rely on unconventional oil to complement them, and oil from the Canadian oil sands is the best unconventional oil we can get.

The book covers the history and technology of Canadian oil sands and pertinent issues related to the economy, environment and ethics. Patel has made a case for the oil sands, but at the same time has also addressed the main drawbacks of extracting and using this oil.

In other words, the book objectively presents the arguments of both oil sands critics and proponents and presents all the main objections to oil sands development posed by journalists, environmentalists, first Nations leaders, and others. As a result, the reader should gain a better understanding of the issues involved, and be able to form their opinion about Canada’s oil sands.

Media Response
On the book's release in November 2012, it sparked significant interest in the media and the author appeared in various interviews including popular television and radio shows in Canada. Immediately after its release, the author appeared in more than 20 media interviews including the following:
CTV Morning Live Calgary
The Rutherford Show 770 CHQR
CBC Radio British Columbia – Early Edition with Rick Cluff
CTV Noon News Edmonton
CBC Radio - Alberta at Noon with Host Donna McElligott 
Global News Edmonton
CityTV Breakfast Television Edmonton 
Alberta Primetime- CTV2 Edmonton
660 News with Kevin Usselman Calgary
The Rob Breakenridge Show on the Corus Radio Network
Dave Cooper, Edmonton Journal.
Frank Peebles, Prince George Citizen.
Vincent McDermott, Fort McMurray Today.
Oil sands review magazine by Deborah Jeremko
Clean sands (2013); The Oil & Gas Week. Retrieved 2013-09-08

External links

See also
A Thousand Barrels a Second
Ethical Oil: The Case for Canada's Oil Sands

References

Petroleum industry in Canada
Environmental policy
2012 non-fiction books